WZCC is a commercial classic country radio station in Cross City, Florida, broadcasting to the Tri-County area of Dixie, Levy, and Gilchrist counties on 1240 AM.

In 2007 the station was sold to WRGO RADIO, LLC.  In February 2010 the station was sold to Suncoast Radio, Inc.  The station was off the air for most of 2009.  WZCC resumed broadcasting on March 5, 2010.

In addition to classic country music WZCC airs NASCAR Sprint Cup Series races from the Motor Racing Network, and local high school football.

On December 1, 2010, WZCC began simulcasting with WLQH AM 940 in Chiefland.  In August 2013 WZCC began broadcasting on an FM translator W227AV 93.3 MHz in Newberry; though licensed to Newberry in western Alachua County, the translator did not serve that community, covering instead an area between Chiefland and Fanning Springs from a transmitter along U.S. 19/98 north of Chiefland.

References
1992 Broadcasting Yearbook, page A-69

External links

ZCC
Classic country radio stations in the United States
Radio stations established in 1985
1985 establishments in Florida